Campsie may refer to:

 Campsie, New South Wales, Australia
 Campsie, Alberta, Canada 
 Campsie, County Tyrone, a townland in County Tyrone, Northern Ireland
 Campsie Fells, range of hills in Scotland
 Campsie, Stirlingshire, historic civil parish based in the area
 Milton of Campsie, town in the parish (now East Dunbartonshire)
 Campsie F.C., football team based in the above town
 Campsie Village, area of Lennoxtown in Campsie civil parish
Campsie Central F.C., football team based on Lennoxtown
 Campsie Black Watch F.C., football team based in the above town